Darkest Mercy is an Urban fantasy novel by Melissa Marr. It is set in the same universe as Marr's previous YA novels, but is not a sequel to Radiant Shadows; rather, it is a follow-up to Wicked Lovely and Fragile Eternity.

Critical response
Kirkus found it hard work, "for fans only". However RT Book Reviews was much more positive, seeing it as an excellent if shocking conclusion to the series.

References

Urban fantasy novels
American fantasy novels
American young adult novels
2011 American novels
HarperCollins books